The Soviet Union's 1982 nuclear test series was a group of 20 nuclear tests conducted in 1982. These tests  followed the 1981 Soviet nuclear tests series and preceded the 1983 Soviet nuclear tests series.

References

1982
1982 in the Soviet Union
1982 in military history
Explosions in 1982